Dusi is a census town in Tiruvanamalai district  in the state of Tamil Nadu, India.

Geography
It has an average elevation of 74 metres (242 feet).

This Village have Dusi Mamandur Lake and it is 3 km away from Palar River

Demographics
 India census, Dusi had a population of 5102.  Males constitute 50% of the population and females 50%.  Dusi has an average literacy rate of 60%, higher than the national average of 59.5%: male literacy is 71% and, female literacy is 48%.  In Dusi, 13% of the population is under 6 years of age.

References

[] https://web.archive.org/web/20110225214916/http://dusi-roots.zxq.net:80/index.html

Cities and towns in Tiruvannamalai district